Francis Hastings (1560–1595), of Old Place, near Ashby Castle, Leicestershire, was an English politician.

He was a Member (MP) of the Parliament of England for Leicestershire in 1593.

References

1560 births
1595 deaths
Members of the Parliament of England for Leicestershire
People from Ashby-de-la-Zouch
English MPs 1593